Deo K. Rwabiita (1943 – 7 June 2017) was a Ugandan politician and diplomat.

Born in Ibanda District in 1943, Rwabiita studied marketing at the University of Nairobi in Kenya. He was appointed Deputy Minister of Relief and Social Rehabilitation in 1988 and took office in the parliament of Uganda later that year as a representative of Ibanda. He served until 2001, and was succeeded in office by John Byabagambi. Rwabiita later served as Ugandan ambassador to Belgium, Germany, and Italy. He died at the age of 74 on 7 June 2017, while at Kiruddu General Hospital.

References

1943 births
2017 deaths
People from Ibanda District
University of Nairobi alumni
Members of the Parliament of Uganda
Ambassadors of Uganda to Germany
Ambassadors of Uganda to Italy
Ambassadors of Uganda to Belgium